The Costa Rica national basketball team is the national basketball team from Costa Rica. 

Team Costa Rica has never qualified for the FIBA World Cup or the FIBA AmeriCup. Yet, the team has shown strong performances at the regional level. At the 2015 FIBA COCABA Championship, Costa Rica finished 2nd, its best performance so far.

Judged by the 2020 FIBA Ranking, Costa Rica has the 2nd best basketball national team in Central America, coming only behind Panama.

Competitions

Summer Olympics
Yet to qualify

FIBA World Cup
Yet to qualify

FIBA AmeriCup
Yet to qualify

Pan American Games
Yet to qualify

Centrobasket

COCABA Championship

Central American and the Caribbean Games

Current roster
At the 2016 Centrobasket:

|}

| valign="top" |

Head coach

Assistant coaches

Legend

Club – describes lastclub before the tournament
Age – describes ageon 19 June 2016

|}

At the 2016 Centrobasket in Panama City, Panama, Carlos Quesada played most minutes for Costa Rica whereas Kay Martinez was the team's top scorer and also recorded most steals for the team.

Depth chart

Head coach position
 Luis Blanco – 2006
 Neil Gottlieb – 2007-2008
 Luis Blanco – 2009
 Jorge Arguello – 2010
 Luis Blanco – 2011-2012
 Jorge Arguello – 2013
 Alexis Monge – 2014
 Joshua Erickson – 2015-2016
 Alexis Monge – 2017
 Daniel Simmons – 2018

3x3 Team
Costa Rica features 3x3 basketball national teams, from senior level all the way to U12 teams.

Kit

Manufacturer
2018: Nike

See also
Costa Rica women's national basketball team
Costa Rica national under-19 basketball team
Costa Rica women's national under-19 basketball team
Costa Rica national 3x3 team

References

External links
Official website
Latinbasket.com - Costa Rica Men National Team
Costa Rica Basketball

Videos
Belize v Costa Rica - FIBA AmeriCup 2021 Pre-Qualifier - Central America Youtube.com video

Men's national basketball teams
Basketball
Basketball in Costa Rica
Basketball teams in Costa Rica
1969 establishments in Costa Rica